Macau first competed at the Asian Games in 1990, after the Macau Olympic Committee joined the Olympic Council of Asia in 1989. They have claimed 2 gold, 9 silver and 18 bronze medals.

Medal tables

Medals by Asian Games

Medals by Asian Winter Games

Gold Medalists